Larry Bellew (born July 5, 1952) is an American politician. He is a member of the North Dakota House of Representatives from the 38th District, serving since 2001, and is a member of the Republican party. He served as Speaker of the North Dakota House of Representatives during the 2017-19 biennium.

Bellew was born in Montana and currently lives in Minot, North Dakota in District 38. He holds an A.A. degree in horticulture from the University of Guelph. He served in the United States Air Force from 1971 to 1975.

References

1952 births
Living people
21st-century American politicians
People from Havre, Montana
University of Guelph alumni
United States Air Force airmen
Speakers of the North Dakota House of Representatives
Republican Party members of the North Dakota House of Representatives